Manuel Scavone (born 3 June 1987) is an Italian association footballer who plays as a midfielder for  club Brescia.

Career
Born in Bolzano, the autonomous province of South Tyrol, Italy, Scavone started his career at hometown club Südtirol. He made over 100 appearances in Italian Lega Pro Seconda Divisione. In February 2010 he signed a pre-contract with Novara, of Lega Pro Prima Divisione. He officially joined Novara at the end of 2009–10 season, signing 3-year contract, which Novara also promoted to Serie B.

Scavone played 25 games in the second division, which the team also won promotion in successive year. He only started 8 times that season.

In July 2011 he was transferred to Serie B club Bari, also in 3-year contract.

In July 2016 he joined Parma, where he spent two seasons earning two consecutive promotions to Serie B and Serie A.

In August 2018 he moved to Serie B side Lecce on loan and helped the giallorossi team gain promotion to Serie A. During his time at Lecce, Scavone suffered from a head injury after only 4 seconds from kick off in Lecce – Ascoli. The game was suspended and postponed to 23 March 2019, won by Lecce 7:0.

In July 2019 he was signed by Serie C newcomers Bari.

On 29 September 2020 he joined Serie B club Pordenone on loan.

On 31 January 2023, Scavone signed with Brescia.

Representative team
Scavone capped once for Italy under-20 Serie C team in 2004–05 Mirop Cup.

Honours
Bari
 Serie C: 2021–22 (Group C)

References

External links
 Football.it Profile 
 
 calciatori.com 
 

1987 births
Living people
Sportspeople from Bolzano
Footballers from Trentino-Alto Adige/Südtirol
Italian footballers
Association football midfielders
Serie B players
Serie C players
Lega Pro Seconda Divisione players
F.C. Südtirol players
Novara F.C. players
S.S.C. Bari players
F.C. Pro Vercelli 1892 players
Parma Calcio 1913 players
U.S. Lecce players
Pordenone Calcio players
Brescia Calcio players